Vijay Balakrishna Shenoy is a Professor of Physics at the Indian Institute of Science, Bangalore, India.  He was awarded the Shanti Swarup Bhatnagar Prize for science and technology, the highest science award in India, for the year 2013 in the physical sciences category.

Biography

Vijay B. Shenoy obtained his B.Tech. (Mechanical) from IIT, Madras in 1992 and his M.S. from Georgia Tech. in 1994. He received his Doctorate degree from Brown University in 1998. For a short period he took Adjunct Assistant Professorship in Brown University in 1999. Later he joined the faculty of IIT, Kanpur from 1999 to 2002. In 2002, he joined Indian Institute of Science. Currently he works on theoretical condensed matter physics with focus on strongly interacting/correlated fermionic systems.

Research
His work on the Rashbon is said to have opened a new range of possibilities and new directions for physics.

External links

Interview with Vijay Balakrishna Shenoy : When future can be a reality

References

Indian condensed matter physicists
Academic staff of the Indian Institute of Science
Scientists from Bangalore
Brown University alumni
Recipients of the Shanti Swarup Bhatnagar Award in Physical Science
Living people
Year of birth missing (living people)